Tommy Tighe is a sports radio broadcaster who previously worked for the Westwood One radio network. He had been employed by the network since CBS radio days, hired in 1987 as a reporter and a commentator. He currently does work for ESPN Radio as a sportscenter anchor.

Career
Tighe can currently be heard on 790 the Ticket doing the pre- and post-game Miami Heat broadcasts. Tommy also has a Saturday morning show form 9am - 11am on 790 the Ticket.

Tighe was Westwood One's primary studio host for its sports broadcasts. He hosted the pre- and post-game studio shows for The NFL on Westwood One and has since been replaced by Scott Graham. Tighe also hosted the network's coverage of NCAA college basketball and football (except for Westwood One's Notre Dame football coverage, which was produced separately from the weekly college football package Westwood One airs). In addition, he hosted the Westwood One recap show  NFL Sunday, which aired an hour prior to the Westwood one Sunday Night Football broadcast.

Also, prior to 2004, Tighe hosted the pre- and post- game shows for Monday Night Football on the network, but was replaced by Jim Gray.

Tighe's other credits for Westwood One include U.S. Open tennis coverage, a weekday sports recap show called "Sportstime", and a weekend sports report segment known as "Sports Central USA," which he did prior to taking over as pre-game host for nearly all sports broadcasts on the network. Mr. Tighe is also the captain of the five-time champion Thursday Night Bowling team 'Tommy's Tools.'

References

American radio sports announcers
American television sports announcers
National Football League announcers
College football announcers
College basketball announcers in the United States
Tennis commentators
Living people
National Basketball Association broadcasters
Miami Heat announcers
Year of birth missing (living people)